Ahmed Debes (born January 14, 1970) is an Egyptian handball player. He competed for Egypt's national team at the 1992 Summer Olympics.

References 

1970 births
Living people
Egyptian male handball players
Olympic handball players of Egypt
Handball players at the 1992 Summer Olympics